Robert Keayne (1595 – March 23, 1656) was a prominent public figure in 17th-century Boston, Massachusetts. He co-founded the Ancient and Honorable Artillery Company of Massachusetts and served as speaker of the House of the Massachusetts General Court. Keayne was a prosperous London merchant who joined his fellow Puritans in Boston where he built a fortune.  He was accused of unfair business practices, and brought before the legislature, the Massachusetts General Court.  It found Keayne guilty, fined him, and compelled him to confess his "sins."  He proclaimed his innocence, and justified his actions in elaborate detail in his will.  It bequeathed £2500 to Boston, to upgrade the infrastructure with an aqueduct, relieve the city's poor, and fund the First Town-House, a grand public meeting place.  He attached a condition to the effect that the bequest would become void if there were any legal actions against his estate; there were none.

Biography 

Keayne was born in Windsor, England in 1595. His father, John Keayne, worked as a butcher. While living in London, Keayne held membership in the Honourable Artillery Company and the Merchant Taylor's Company. He also kept notes in his private journal of sermons preached 1627-1628 by John Cotton, John Wilson, Hugh Peters, and John Davenport.

In 1617 Keayne married Anne Mansfield; they had a son, Benjamin Keayne, in 1619.

Keayne and his family arrived in Boston from London in 1635 on the ship Defence.  In Boston, he worked as a tailor, and kept a shop on State Street, "living in apartments overhead, as was the custom in those times."

He belonged to the First Church congregation, and kept notes in his private journal of sermons preached by John Wilson, Thomas Cobbet, and John Cotton, who had moved to Boston in 1633.

In 1637, he was found guilty and fined 200 pounds by a Puritan court for overcharging customers.  By today's capitalistic standards he would have been judged shrewd and successful.  At the time, he penitently bewailed "his covetous and corrupt heart," but justified himself at length in his will.

In 1638, he helped to establish the Ancient and Honorable Artillery Company of Massachusetts, serving as first captain.

He served as town Selectman for several years; and as a representative to the  Massachusetts General Court, being appointed House Speaker in 1646.

Keayne left a 37-page will, covering a range of topics, which notably left several hundred pounds to establish the First Town-House, a building to "be used by the town and county government and be shared by the military company, with convenience for a market and conduit near by." Remarking on the need for a covered market, he wrote:

I having long thought and considered the want of some necessary things of public concernment which may not be only comodious, but very profitable and useful for the Town of Boston, as a market place ... useful for the country people that come with their provisions for the supply of the towne, that they may have a place to sett dry in and warme, both in cold raine and durty weather, and may have a place to leave their corne or any other things safe that they cannot sell, till they come again, which would be both an encouragement to come in and a great means to increase trading in the Towne also.

Keayne died in 1656 and is buried in the King's Chapel Burying Ground where a plaque has been affixed to his brick burial vault. Another memorial plaque, placed in 1925, honors Keayne in downtown Boston, on the corner of State and Washington Streets. Each year on the first Monday in June the Ancient and Honorable Artillery Company leads a procession to the gravesite, laying a wreath in Keayne's memory.

References

Further reading 
 Bailyn, Bernard. "The Apologia of Robert Keayne." William and Mary Quarterly  (1950): 568-587. in JSTOR
 Dalzell, Jr. Robert F. The Good Rich and What They Cost Us (Yale University Press, 2013)

External links
 

People from colonial Boston
Speakers of the Massachusetts House of Representatives
American philanthropists
1595 births
1656 deaths
17th century in Boston
Burials in Boston
People from Windsor, Berkshire
Kingdom of England emigrants to Massachusetts Bay Colony
17th-century philanthropists
Honourable Artillery Company officers